Dutchman is a play written by African-American playwright Amiri Baraka, then known as LeRoi Jones. Dutchman was first presented  at the Cherry Lane Theatre in Greenwich Village, New York City, in March 1964 co-produced by Rita Fredricks. The play won an Obie Award; it shared this distinction with Adrienne Kennedy's Funnyhouse of a Negro. Baraka's stage play was made into a film in 1967, starring Shirley Knight and Al Freeman Jr. Dutchman was the last play produced by Baraka under his birth name, LeRoi Jones. At the time, he was in the process of divorcing his Jewish wife, Hettie Jones, and embracing Black nationalism. Dutchman may be described as a political allegory depicting black and white relations during the time Baraka wrote it.

The play was revived in 2007 at the Cherry Lane Theatre starring Dulé Hill, and in 2013 was restaged by Rashid Johnson at the Russian and Turkish Baths in the East Village.

Plot
The action focuses almost exclusively on Lula, a mature white woman, and Clay, a young black man, who both ride the subway in New York City. Clay's name is symbolic of the malleability of black identity and black manhood. It is also symbolic of integrationist and assimilationist ideologies within the contemporary Civil Rights Movement. Lula boards the train eating an apple, an allusion to the Biblical Eve. The characters engage in a long, flirtatious conversation throughout the train ride.

Lula sits down next to Clay. She accuses him of staring at her buttocks. She ignores his denials and uses stereotypes to correctly guess where he lives, where he is going, what Clay's friend, Warren, looks and talks like. Lula guesses that Clay tried to get his own sister to have sex with him when he was 10. Clay is shocked by her apparent knowledge of his past and says that she must be a friend of Warren.

Lula is glad that Clay is so easy to manipulate and puts her hand on his leg. She feeds him apples. She tells Clay to invite her out to the party he is going to. At this point, it is unclear whether Clay is really going to a party, but he tells her he really is. Lula vaguely alludes to having sex with Clay at her "apartment" after the "party". We don't know if these are real or conveniently made-up by Lula.

Clay is gladdened by Lula's apparent liking for him and maintains a hopeful attitude to having sex together. However, he does not push his hope onto her and waits for Lula to make the offer first.

Lula is angered by Clay's not falling for her  manipulative tactics. She switches strategies and mocks Clay's Anglo-American speech, his college education and his three-button suit. She derides his being black and passive. She dances mockingly in an R&B style and tells Clay to join her and "do the nasty. Rub bellies".

Clay, who does not respond initially, eventually grabs her and throws her down. Clay accuses Lula of knowing nothing but "luxury". He slaps her twice and tells her to leave him alone.

Clay launches into a monologue. Clay suggests that whites let black people dance "black" dances and make "black" music. He explains that these segregatory actions assuage black Americans' anger towards whites and distracts them from accessing the "white man's intellectual legacy". Clay states that if black people stopped trying to heal their pain through dance, music, civic participation, religion, or focusing on moving upwards in American society, and became coldly rational like white people, black people would just kill all the whites and be done with racism in America. Clay says that if he were to take Lula's words to heart, he should just kill all the white people he meets.

Although Clay says all this, he deeply rejects this plan of action. He states that he does not want to kill and that he prefers to be ignorant of the problem. He says he would rather choose to pretend to be ignorant of racism, not try to get rid of it by fighting with whites.

Once Clay makes his confession, Lula changes strategies again. Clay makes as if to leave, but Lula coolly, rationally, stabs him twice to the heart. She directs all the other passengers, blacks and whites, in the train car to throw his body out and get out at the next stop.

The play ends with Lula looking towards another young black man who has just boarded the now mostly empty train car. The elderly black train conductor steps into the compartment and tips Lula his hat.

Symbolism 
The play's title evokes images of Dutch ships that carried slaves across the Atlantic. The subway car itself, endlessly traveling the same course, is symbolic of "The Course of History." Another layer of the title's symbolism is the myth of the Flying Dutchman, a ghost ship which, much like the subway car Clay rides on, endlessly sails on with a crew that is unable to escape the confines of the vessel.

Characters
 Clay: is a 20-year-old, middle-class black boy. He is college educated, and well dressed. Clay is extremely calm and well-mannered, although he finally reaches his breaking point by the end of the play. It is thought that Clay's character is both real and symbolic. Symbolizing the real struggle of a black man.
 
 Lula: is a 30-year-old white woman. She is tall, slender, and has long red hair. She is described in the play as loud lipstick, bright, and skimpy summer clothes, with sandals, and sunglasses. Like Clay, Lula is also symbolic, she symbolizes "White America". Throughout the play, Lula continues to seduce and taunt Clay.
 
  Riders of Coach: are white and black. Although they do not play an important role until the end of the play, they are witnesses to Clay's rant, and his murder.
 
 Young Negro: is about 20 years old. He is described to have a couple of books under his arm. It is suggested at the end of the play that he is Lula's next victim.
 
 Conductor: is portrayed as a happy spirited man, mumbling a song to himself, and swaying down the aisle to a song in his head. He does not appear until the end of the play.

References

1964 plays
African-American plays
American plays adapted into films
Plays by Amiri Baraka
Plays set in New York City
Two-handers